Dubyna  is a village (selo) in Stryi Raion, Lviv Oblast, of  Western Ukraine. It belongs to Skole urban hromada, one of the hromadas of Ukraine.

The village is located on the banks of the Opir River along the Highway M06 (Ukraine).

Local government — Verkhnosynovydnenska settlement council.

The first written mention of the village dates from the year 1561 and the name of the village is derived from the surrounding oak forests (dubovyy lis).

Until 18 July 2020, Dubyna belonged to Skole Raion. The raion was abolished in July 2020 as part of the administrative reform of Ukraine, which reduced the number of raions of Lviv Oblast to seven. The area of Skole Raion was merged into Stryi Raion.

Famous people who have visited the village  
 Solomiya Krushelnytska (1872 – 1952) – Ukrainian opera singer, was one of the brightest soprano opera stars of the first half of the 20th century.
 Myroslav Skoryk (1938) – Ukrainian composer and teacher, People's Artist of Ukraine, winner of the Prize Shevchenko.

Gallery

References

External links 
 village Dubyna
 weather.in.ua

Villages in Stryi Raion